Austropyrgus is a genus of  minute freshwater snails with an operculum, aquatic gastropod molluscs or micromolluscs in the Hydrobiidae family. Austropyrgus species are endemic to Australia, where they are found in virtually all freshwater habitats, from high mountain streams to isolated springs in the arid zone.

Species
With 76 recognized species, Austropyrgus is the largest genus of Australian freshwater molluscs and is the most widespread of the Australian freshwater Hydrobiidae genera.
Austropyrgus species include:

 Austropyrgus abercrombiensis Clark, Miller & Ponder, 2003
 Austropyrgus angasi (E. A. Smith, 1882)
 Austropyrgus aslini Clark, Miller & Ponder, 2003
 Austropyrgus avius Clark, Miller & Ponder, 2003
 Austropyrgus buchanensis Clark, Miller & Ponder, 2003
 Austropyrgus bullerensis Clark, Miller & Ponder, 2003
 Austropyrgus bungoniensis Clark, Miller & Ponder, 2003
 Austropyrgus colensis Clark, Miller & Ponder, 2003
 Austropyrgus colludens Clark, Miller & Ponder, 2003
 Austropyrgus conicus Clark, Miller & Ponder, 2003
 Austropyrgus cooma (Iredale, 1943)
Austropyrgus dyerianus (Petterd, 1879)
Austropyrgus elongatus (May, 1921)
Austropyrgus eumekes Clark, Miller & Ponder, 2003
Austropyrgus foris (Ponder, Colgan, Clark, Miller & Terzis, 1994)
Austropyrgus grampianensis (Gabriel, 1939)
Austropyrgus halletensis Clark, Miller & Ponder, 2003
Austropyrgus nepeanensis Clark, Miller & Ponder, 2003
Austropyrgus niger (Quoy & Gaimard, 1834)
Austropyrgus ora Clark, Miller & Ponder, 2003
Austropyrgus parvus Clark, Miller & Ponder, 2003
Austropyrgus pusillus Clark, Miller & Ponder, 2003
Austropyrgus rectoides Clark, Miller & Ponder, 2003
Austropyrgus ronkershawi Clark, Miller & Ponder, 2003
Austropyrgus salvus Clark, Miller & Ponder, 2003
Austropyrgus sinuatus Clark, Miller & Ponder, 2003
Austropyrgus smithii (Petterd, 1889)
Austropyrgus tateiformis Clark, Miller & Ponder, 2003
Austropyrgus tumidus Clark, Miller & Ponder, 2003

References

 
Hydrobiidae